Daniel Sorensen (born March 5, 1990) is an American football safety who is a free agent. He played college football at BYU.

Professional career

Kansas City Chiefs

2014
On May 11, 2014, the Kansas City Chiefs signed Sorensen to a two-year, $930,000 contract after he went undrafted during the 2014 NFL Draft. After going undrafted, Sorensen received  calls and offers from multiple teams, but stated he chose to accept the Chiefs' offer because they showed they really wanted him by having head coach Andy Reid call him personally.

Throughout training camp, he competed for a roster spot as a backup safety against Sanders Commings, Jerron McMillian, and Malcolm Bronson. He received an opportunity to display his ability after Commings aggravated a foot injury and missed the majority of training camp. He went on to start three preseason games at strong safety after Eric Berry sustained an injury to his heel. On August 28, 2014, Sorensen recorded five combined tackles and a pass deflection during a 34–14 loss at the Green Bay Packers in their fourth preseason games. He started all four preseason game and recorded nine combined tackles (seven solo) and a pass deflection. Head coach Andy Reid named Sorensen the backup strong safety, behind Eric Berry, to begin the regular season.

He made his professional regular season debut in the Kansas City Chiefs' season-opener against the Tennessee Titans and recorded his first career tackle on Coty Sensabaugh after Sensabaugh recovered a fumble by Titans' kick returner Leon Washington during a Titans' kick return in the second quarter of their 16–10 loss. On September 9, 2014, Sorensen was waived by the Kansas City Chiefs and was signed to the practice squad two days later. It was reported his demotion to practice squad was due to two blunders on special teams that resulted in a failed fake punt and an offsides penalty during their 24–10 victory against the New York Jets. He was promoted back to the active roster on November 1, 2014. On December 28, 2014, Sorensen recorded a season-high two solo tackles in the Chiefs' 19–7 victory against the San Diego Chargers. He finished his rookie season with seven combined tackles (six solo) in nine games and zero starts and was a consistent contributor on special teams.

2015
Sorensen entered training camp competing for a roster spot as a backup safety against Sanders Commings, Kelcie McCray, and Justin Cox. Defensive coordinator Bob Sutton named Sorensen the third free safety on the depth chart to start the 2015 regular season, behind starter Husain Abdullah and Eric Berry. He was also named the starting punt protector by special teams coach Dave Toub.

In Week 10, Sorensen recorded three solo tackles and his first career pass deflection during a 29–13 victory at the Denver Broncos. On December 6, 2015, Sorensen made combined tackles and his first career sack on quarterback Derek Carr in the Chiefs' 34–20 victory at the Oakland Raiders in Week 13. He finished the  season with 23 combined tackles (20 solo), two pass deflections, and a sack in 16 games and zero starts.

The Kansas City Chiefs finished second in the AFC West with an 11–5 record. On January 9, 2016, Sorensen appeared in his first career playoff game as the Chiefs routed the Houston Texans 30–0 in the AFC Wildcard Game. The following week, he made one tackle in during a 27–20 loss at the New England Patriots in the AFC Divisional round.

2016
During OTA's and training camp, Sorensen competed for a role as a backup safety against Jamell Fleming, Eric Murray, Shakiel Randolph, Stevie Brown, and Akeem Davis. Head coach Andy Reid named him the backup strong safety behind Eric Berry to begin the regular season in 2016.

On September 25, 2016, Sorensen recorded two solo tackles, two pass deflections, and made his first career interception off a pass by quarterback Ryan Fitzpatrick during a 24–3 victory against the New York Jets in Week 3. In Week 7, Sorensen made six solo tackles, a pass deflection, a sack, and returned an interception by Drew Brees for a 48-yard touchdown in the Chiefs' 27–21 win against the New Orleans Saints. His score in the first quarter was the first touchdown of his career. The following week, he collected a season-high seven solo tackles during a 30–14 win at the Indianapolis Colts. On December 4, 2016, Sorensen earned his first career start, as a nickelback, in place of an injured Phillip Gaines. He recorded five combined tackles and broke up a pass in a 29–28 victory at the Atlanta Falcons. In Week 14, Sorensen collected a season-high eight combined tackles during a 21–13 victory against the Oakland Raiders. He finished the  season with 63 combined tackles (55 solo), six pass deflections, three interceptions, a sack, and a touchdown in 16 games and one start.

2017
On March 11, 2017, the Kansas City Chiefs signed Sorensen to a four-year, $16 million contract extension that includes a $4 million signing bonus.

He entered training camp slated as a backup safety, but saw minor competition from Eric Murray, Steven Terrell, Leon McQuay III, Marqueston Huff, and Jordan Stern. Defensive coordinator Bob Sutton named Sorensen the backup strong safety, behind Eric Berry, to start the regular season.

Starting strong safety Eric Berry tore his Achilles tendon in the Chiefs' season-opening 42–27 victory at the New England Patriots and missed the rest of the season. Due to Berry's injury, Sorensen became the starter at strong safety. On September 17, 2017, Sorensen made his second career start, but first as a safety, in the Chiefs' 27–20 win against the Philadelphia Eagles and recorded six solo tackles. In Week 11, he recorded six combined tackles, deflected a pass, and intercepted a pass by running back Shane Vereen in a 12–9 loss at the New York Giants. Sorensen made the interception in the first quarter after Vereen attempted a pass on a half back option to tight end Evan Engram. On December 3, 2017, Sorensen collected a season-high 11 combined tackles (six solo) in Kansas City's 38–31 loss at the New York Jets in Week 13. He was inactive for the Chiefs' Week 17 victory at the Denver Broncos. Head coach Andy Reid opted to rest him as the Chiefs had already clinched a playoff berth. He finished the season with 89 combined tackles (67 solo), six pass deflections, 1.5 sacks, and an interception in 15 games and 14 starts.

The Kansas City Chiefs finished the 2017 season atop the AFC West with a 10–6 record. On January 6, 2018, Sorenson started a playoff game for the first time in his four-year career and recorded three combined tackles during a 22–21 loss to the Tennessee Titans.

2018
On September 2, 2018, Sorensen was placed on injured reserve after suffering a knee injury in training camp. He was activated off injured reserve on November 6, 2018. In Week 17, in a 35–3 victory over the Oakland Raiders, he recorded his second career pick-six.

2019
In Week 11 against the Los Angeles Chargers on Monday Night Football, Sorensen intercepted a pass thrown by Philip Rivers in the endzone late in the fourth quarter to seal a 24–17 win.

In the Divisional Round of the playoffs against the Houston Texans, Sorensen recorded a team high nine tackles and stopped Houston Texans safety Justin Reid short of the first down marker, giving the Chiefs the ball back after the Houston Texans attempted a fake punt.  Later in the game, Sorensen forced a fumble on Texans kick returner DeAndre Carter, which was recovered by teammate Darwin Thompson.

In Super Bowl LIV, Sorensen had six tackles and held Pro Bowl tight end George Kittle to only 36 receiving yards in the 31–20 victory over the San Francisco 49ers.

2020
In Week 6 against the Buffalo Bills, Sorensen intercepted a pass thrown by Josh Allen late in the fourth quarter to help secure a 26–17 Chiefs' win. In Week 7 against the Denver Broncos, Sorensen intercepted a pass thrown by Drew Lock and returned it for a 50 yard touchdown during the 43–16 win. In Week 11 against the Las Vegas Raiders on Sunday Night Football, Sorensen intercepted a pass thrown by Derek Carr late in the fourth quarter to secure a 35–31 win for the Chiefs. Overall, Sorensen finished the 2020 season with 91 total tackles, five passes defensed, two forced fumbles, and three interceptions.

2021
Sorensen re-signed with the Chiefs on March 29, 2021. He entered the season as the third safety behind Tyrann Mathieu and Juan Thornhill. He played in 17 games with 12 starts, recording 51 tackles, one sack, eight passes defensed, and two interceptions.

New Orleans Saints
Sorensen signed with the New Orleans Saints on March 25, 2022.

Personal life
Sorensen was raised by his parents, Kory and Roxann Sorensen, in Grand Terrace, California. He served a 2-year mission for the Church of Jesus Christ of Latter-day Saints in San Jose, Costa Rica. He has a sister named Emily and four brothers named Trevan, Bryan, Cody, and Brad. His older brother, Brad Sorensen, played college football at Southern Utah and was selected in the seventh round of the 2013 NFL Draft.

References

External links
BYU Cougars bio
Kansas City Chiefs bio

1990 births
Living people
21st-century Mormon missionaries
American football safeties
American Latter Day Saints
BYU Cougars football players
Kansas City Chiefs players
New Orleans Saints players
People from Colton, California
Players of American football from California
Sportspeople from San Bernardino County, California